Oakton is a census-designated place (CDP) in Fairfax County, Virginia, United States. The population was 36,732 at the 2020 census.

Geography
Oakton is located in central Fairfax County at  (38.883050, −77.289900). The area is traversed by Interstate 66 and Virginia State Route 123.

The CDP is bordered to the south by the city of Fairfax, to the west by Fair Oaks, to the northwest by Difficult Run, to the north by the Wolf Trap CDP, to the east by the town of Vienna, and to the southeast by Merrifield.

Demographics
As of the census of 2000, there were 29,348 people, 11,118 households, and 7,649 families residing in the CDP. The racial makeup of the CDP was 74.46% White, 5.79% African American, 0.20% Native American, 13.83% Asian, 0.08% Pacific Islander, 3.08% from other races, and 3.56% from two or more races. Hispanic or Latino of any race were 9.65% of the population.

There were 11,118 households, out of which 32.7% had children under the age of 18 living with them, 57.8% were married couples living together, 7.9% had a female householder with no husband present, and 31.2% were non-families. 21.7% of all households were made up of individuals, and 3.8% had someone living alone who was 65 years of age or older. The average household size was 2.63 and the average family size was 3.08.

In the CDP, the population was spread out, with 23.3% under the age of 18, 7.7% from 18 to 24, 34.9% from 25 to 44, 26.6% from 45 to 64, and 7.5% who were 65 years of age or older. The median age was 36 years. For every 100 females, there were 97.5 males. For every 100 females age 18 and over, there were 95.0 males.

According to a 2010 estimate, the median income for a household in the CDP was $167,512, and the median income for a family was $188,308. Males had a median income of $111,856 versus $73,254 for females. The per capita income for the CDP was $65,934. About 3.9% of families and 4.7% of the population were below the poverty line, including 4.7% of those under age 18 and 6.7% of those age 65 or over.

Notable people
 Jim Callis, executive editor of Baseball America
 Bryan Caplan, professor of economics at George Mason University
 Serena Deeb, a professional wrestler who has appeared in World Wrestling Entertainment, Ring of Honor, Total Nonstop Action, AEW
 John Doolittle, former member of the U.S. House of Representatives
 Robert F. Dorr, author and former U.S. diplomat
 Mortimer L. Downey, former U.S. Deputy Secretary of Transportation
 Keith Fimian, businessman and political candidate
 Ira Noel Gabrielson, naturalist
 Bud Grace, cartoonist
 Francis Greenlief, U.S. Army major general and Chief of the National Guard Bureau
 David E. Jeremiah, U.S. Navy admiral
 Thomas David Jones, author and former astronaut
 John D. Lavelle, U.S. Air Force general and commander of the Seventh Air Force
 Kigeli V of Rwanda, deposed King of Rwanda
 Fred Moosally, captain of the battleship  during the infamous 1989 USS Iowa turret explosion
 Daniel R. Pearson, former chairman of the U.S. International Trade Commission
 Nancy Pfotenhauer, spokesperson for the 2008 John McCain presidential campaign
 Jennifer Rubin, columnist for The Washington Post
 Romuald Spasowski, former Polish ambassador to the United States
 John Stertzer, professional soccer player, selected 12th overall by Real Salt Lake in the 2013 MLS SuperDraft
 John H. Sununu, former White House aide and governor of New Hampshire
 Jared Taylor, white nationalist and founder of American Renaissance
 Philip Terzian, journalist and author, former literary editor of The Weekly Standard
Alan S. Thompson, retired vice admiral and former director of the U.S. Defense Logistics Agency
 Jacob Frey, mayor of Minneapolis, Minnesota
 Grand Belial's Key, an influential neo-Nazi black metal band
 Arghoslent, a pro-slavery melodic death metal band

Education

Primary and secondary schools
Fairfax County Public Schools operates the public schools. There are two public schools located in Oakton: Oakton Elementary School and Waples Mill Elementary School. Flint Hill School, a private school, is located in Oakton. The Northern Virginia Friends School, and the Montessori School of Oakton are also in the CDP. Students may also attend Flint Hill Elementary School, Luther Jackson Middle School or Henry David Thoreau Middle School in Vienna. Local high schools are Oakton High School and James Madison High School. Both schools have Vienna mailing addresses.

Public libraries
Fairfax County Public Library operates the Oakton Library in the CDP.

References

 

Washington metropolitan area
Census-designated places in Virginia
Census-designated places in Fairfax County, Virginia
Unincorporated communities in Virginia